Middleburg Historic District may refer to:

Middleburg Historic District (Middleburg, Florida), listed on the NRHP in Florida
Middleburg Historic District (Middleburg, Virginia), listed on the NRHP in Virginia

See also 
Middleburg Plantation, listed on the NRHP in Huger, South Carolina